This taxonomy of the Dermaptera follows Engel & Haas (2007) to the rank of Tribe.

Taxonomy
 Order Dermaptera de Geer, 1773
 Suborder †Archidermaptera Bey-Bienko, 1936s
 Superfamily †Protodiplatyoidea Martynov, 1925a
 Family †Protodiplatyidae Martynov, 1925a
 Family †Dermapteridae Vishniakova, 1980
 Subfamily †Dermapterinae Vishniakova, 1980
 Subfamily †Turanoviinae Engel, 2003
 Suborder †Eodermaptera Engel, 2003
 Superfamily †Semenovioloidea Vishniakova, 1980
 Family †Semenoviolidae Vishniakova, 1980
 Family †Turanodermatidae Engel, 2003
 Suborder Neodermaptera Engel, 2003
 Infraorder Protodermaptera Zacher, 1910
 Superfamily Karschielloidea Verhoeff, 1902a
 Family Karschiellidae Verhoeff, 1902a
 Superfamily Pygidicranoidea Verhoeff, 1902a
 Family Diplatyidae Verhoeff, 1902a
 Family Pygidicranidae Verhoeff, 1902a
 Subfamily †Burmapygiinae Engel & Grimaldi, 2004
 Subfamily Anataeliinae Burr, 1909b
 Subfamily Blandicinae Burr, 1915
 Subfamily Brindlensiinae Srivastava, 1985b
 Subfamily Challiinae Steinmann, 1973
 Subfamily Cylindrogastrinae Maccagno, 1929
 Subfamily Diplatymorphinae Boeseman, 1954
 Subfamily Echinosomatinae Burr, 1910a
 Subfamily Esphalmeninae Burr, 1909a
 Subfamily Pygidicraninae Verhoeff, 1902a
 Subfamily Pyragrinae Verhoeff, 1902a
 Infraorder Epidermaptera Engel, 2003
 Parvorder Paradermaptera Verhoeff, 1902a
 Superfamily Hemimeroidea Sharp, 1895
 Family Hemimeridae Sharp, 1895
 Superfamily Apachyoidea Verhoeff, 1902a
 Family Apachyidae Verhoeff, 1902a
 Parvorder Metadermaptera Engel, 2003
 Superfamily Anisolabidoidea Verhoeff, 1902a
 Family Anisolabididae Verhoeff, 1902a
 Subfamily †Cretolabiinae Engel & Haas, 2007
 Subfamily Anisolabidinae Verhoeff, 1902a
 Subfamily Anophthalmolabidinae Steinmann, 1975
 Subfamily Antisolabidinae Brindle, 1978a
 Subfamily Brachylabidinae Burr, 1908a
 Subfamily Gonolabininae Popham and Brindle, 1966c
 Subfamily Idolopsalinae Steinmann, 1975
 Subfamily Isolabidinae Verhoeff, 1902b
 Subfamily Palicinae Burr, 1910a
 Subfamily Parisolabidinae Verhoeff, 1904
 Subfamily Titanolabidinae Srivastava, 1982
 Parvorder Eteodermaptera Engel, 2003
 Nanorder Plesiodermaptera Engel, 2003
 Superfamily Labiduroidea Verhoeff, 1902a
 Family Labiduridae Verhoeff, 1902a
 Subfamily Allostethinae Verhoeff, 1904
 Subfamily Labidurinae Verhoeff, 1902a
 Subfamily Nalinae Steinmann, 1975
 Nanorder Eudermaptera Verhoeff, 1902a
 Superfamily Forficuloidea Latreille, 1810
 Family Arixeniidae Jordan, 1909
 Family Spongiphoridae Verhoeff, 1902a
 Subfamily Caecolabiinae Steinmann, 1990
 Subfamily Cosmogeracinae Brindle, 1982
 Subfamily Geracinae Brindle, 1971
 Subfamily Isolaboidinae Brindle, 1978b
 Subfamily Isopyginae Hincks, 1951
 Subfamily Labiinae Burr, 1909b
 Subfamily Nesogastrinae Verhoeff, 1902a
 Subfamily Pericominae Burr, 1911a
 Subfamily Ramamurthiinae Steinmann, 1975
 Subfamily Rudracinae Srivastava, 1995
 Subfamily Sparattinae Verhoeff, 1902a
 Tribe Auchenomini Burr, 1909b
 Tribe Chaetospaniini Steinmann, 1990
 Tribe Sparattini Verhoeff, 1902a
 Subfamily Spongiphorinae Verhoeff, 1902a
 Subfamily Strongylopsalinae Burr, 1911a
 Subfamily Vandicinae Burr, 1911a
 Family Chelisochidae Verhoeff, 1902a
 Subfamily Chelisochinae Verhoeff, 1902a
 Subfamily Genitalatinae Steinmann, 1987
 Subfamily Kinesinae Srivastava, 2003
 Family Forficulidae Latreille, 1810
 Subfamily Allodahliinae Verhoeff, 1902a
 Subfamily Ancistrogastrinae Verhoeff, 1902a
 Subfamily Anechurinae Verhoeff, 1902a
 Subfamily Diaperasticinae Burr, 1907
 Subfamily Forficulinae Latreille, 1810
 Subfamily Neolobophorinae Burr, 1907
 Subfamily Opisthocosmiinae Verhoeff, 1902a
 Subfamily Skendylinae Burr, 1907

Nomina dubia
Family †Ocelliidae Ewing, 1942 is considered a nomen dubium.

References